Zhang Meng (born 6 March 1981), also known as Alina Zhang, is a Chinese actress. She is most well known as the winner of the 2004 Miss China Universe and for her role as the Fire Princess in the 2016 television series Ice Fantasy.

Education
Zhang was enthusiastic about singing and dancing from an early age. She attended dance classes at a Children's Palace from elementary school onwards. Zhang went to Australia as an overseas student for senior secondary school. During this time, she taught piano lessons to earn money. Zhang then attended the University of New South Wales for an undergraduate degree in fashion design, graduating in 2003.

Career

Xk pageantry
Zhang entered the entertainment industry by becoming the champion for Miss China Universe in 2004. She went on to represent China in the 53rd Miss Universe beauty pageant.

As a result of winning Miss China Universe, Zhang was given contracts as brand ambassador for the Shenzhen International Jewellery Fair and other brands.

Acting
Zhang made her onscreen debut in the television series Wo Zhu Chen Fu.

Her breakthrough came in the 2010 fantasy adventure series The Myth, based on the 2005 Hong Kong film of the same title.  It acquired very high viewership ratings, and raised Zhang's profile. She then starred in the business romance drama War and Beauty.

In 2013, Zhang starred in family comedy drama Baby.

In 2014, Zhang earned increased recognition in period romance drama Always Love You. The same year she starred in acclaimed legal drama Divorce Lawyers.

In 2013, Zhang starred in modern romance drama Dare to Love.

In 2016, Zhang starred in fantasy epic drama Ice Fantasy as the Fire Princess, Yan Da.

In 2017, Zhang starred in family drama Weekend Parents. The same year she was nominated at the Huading Awards for Best Supporting Actress with her performance in Little Husband.

In 2018, she starred in adventure drama The Tomb of Sea.

Filmography

Film

Television series

Variety show

Discography

Awards and nominations

References

1981 births
Living people
Actresses from Tianjin
21st-century Chinese actresses
University of New South Wales alumni
Chinese expatriates in Australia
Chinese film actresses
Chinese television actresses
Chinese women television presenters
Chinese television presenters
Chinese broadcasters
Miss Universe 2004 contestants